Meliobba shafferyi is a species of air-breathing land snails, terrestrial pulmonate gastropod mollusks in the family Camaenidae. This species is endemic to Australia.

References 

Gastropods of Australia
shafferyi
Gastropods described in 1940
Taxonomy articles created by Polbot